Bad Love may refer to:

Albums
 Bad Love (album), a 1999 album by Randy Newman
 Bad Love (EP), 2021

Songs
 "Bad Love" (Eric Clapton song), 1989
 "Bad Love" (Key song), 2021
 "Bad Love" (Pake McEntire song), 1986
 "Bad Love", by AAA, 2019
 "Bad Love", by Krokus from Painkiller, 1978
 "Bad Love", by Lita Ford from Dangerous Curves, 1991
 "Bad Love", by Sean Paul from Mad Love the Prequel, 2019

Other media
 Bad Love (TV series) or Cruel Love, a 2007 South Korean drama
 Bad Love, a 1994 Alex Delaware novel by Jonathan Kellerman